The Rosette Nebula (also known as Caldwell 49) is an H II region located near one end of a giant molecular cloud in the Monoceros region of the Milky Way Galaxy. The open cluster NGC 2244 (Caldwell 50) is closely associated with the nebulosity, the stars of the cluster having been formed from the nebula's matter. 

The nebula has been noted to be having a shape reminiscent of a human skull, and is sometimes referred to as the "Skull Nebula." It is not to be confused with NGC 246, which is also nicknamed the "Skull Nebula."

Description

The complex has the following New General Catalogue (NGC) designations:
NGC 2237 – Part of the nebulous region (Also used to denote whole nebula)
NGC 2238 – Part of the nebulous region
NGC 2239 – Part of the nebulous region (Discovered by John Herschel)
NGC 2244 – The open cluster within the nebula (Discovered by John Flamsteed in 1690)
NGC 2246 – Part of the nebulous region

The cluster and nebula lie at a distance of 5,000 light-years from Earth and measure roughly 130 light years in diameter. The radiation from the young stars excites the atoms in the nebula, causing them to emit radiation themselves producing the emission nebula we see. The mass of the nebula is estimated to be around 10,000 solar masses.

A survey of the nebula with the Chandra X-ray Observatory has revealed the presence of numerous new-born stars inside optical Rosette Nebula and studded within a dense molecular cloud. Altogether, approximately 2500 young stars lie in this star-forming complex, including the massive O-type stars HD 46223 and HD 46150, which are primarily responsible for blowing the ionized bubble.
Most of the ongoing star-formation activity is occurring in the dense molecular cloud to the south east of the bubble.

A diffuse X-ray glow is also seen between the stars in the bubble, which has been attributed to a super-hot plasma with temperatures ranging from 1 to 10 million K.
This is significantly hotter than the 10,000 K plasmas seen in HII regions, and is likely attributed to the shock-heated winds from the massive O-type stars.

On April 16, 2019 the Oklahoma Legislature passed HB1292 making the Rosette Nebula as the official state astronomical object. Oklahoma Governor Kevin Stitt signed it into law April 22, 2019.

See also

Lists of astronomical objects

References

External links

Rosette Nebula (SEDS)
Chandra Observatory study of the Rosette Nebula
NOAO; "Fitful Young Star Sputters to Maturity in the Rosette Nebula"
NightSkyInfo.com – Rosette Nebula
Astronomy Picture of the Day
Dust Sculptures in the Rosette Nebula – 2007 June 6
Dust Sculptures in the Rosette Nebula – 2009 December 2
Field of Rosette – 2010 February 14
Slooh Videocast on Rosette Nebula
Rosette Nebula from the Netherlands
Deep image of the Rosette Nebula
The Scale of the Universe (Astronomy Picture of the Day 2012 March 12)

Rosette Nebula at Constellation Guide
Creative Commons Rosette Nebula, Data Download & Processing Guide

H II regions
NGC objects
Monoceros (constellation)
049b
Sharpless objects
Star-forming regions